Collins Mbulo (born 15 January 1970) is a Zambian former professional footballer who played as a goalkeeper. He played in 30 matches for the Zambia national team from 1997 to 2003. He was also named in Zambia's squad for the 1998 African Cup of Nations tournament.

References

External links
 

1970 births
Living people
Zambian footballers
Association football goalkeepers
Zambia international footballers
1998 African Cup of Nations players
Place of birth missing (living people)